My Coming Day is a studio album by Julian Drive. Inpop Records released the album on January 27, 2009. Julian Drive worked with Lynn Nichols, in the production of this album.

Critical reception

Awarding the album four stars for AllMusic, Jared Johnson writes, "My Coming Day is solid throughout and indicates a new yet familiar direction for contemporary Christian rock." Andre Dawn Goforth, rating the album three stars at Christianity Today, states, "there's strong musical skill and passion, so there's some promise for future projects." Giving the album a seven out of ten from Cross Rhythms, Paul Keeble describes it as "a solid debut." David Couch, awarding the album four stars at Jesus Freak Hideout, states, "The title of the album, My Coming Day, gives the impression of greater things to come, and there is no doubt, Julian Drive is one of the bands to watch out for this year." Rating the album a four out of five by The Phantom Tollbooth, Bob Felberg writes, "With a chorus that musically gathers you into its arms, and lyrics so loaded with hope, assurance  and encouragement just one listen is transporting and uplifting."

Track listing

Chart performance

References

2009 albums
Inpop Records albums